The Speaker of the Legislative Assembly of Prince Edward Island is the presiding officer of the provincial legislature.

The Speakership is currently held by Colin LaVie. The Deputy Speaker is Hal Perry.

Past speakers have included Wilbur MacDonald, Greg Deighan and Nancy Guptill.

List of speakers

Speakers of the Colony of the Island of Saint John/Prince Edward Island
Robert Stewart (1773–1779)
David Higgins (1779–1780)
Walter Berry (1780–1784)
Alexander Fletcher  (1785–1787)
Phillips Callbeck (1788–1789)
Alexander Fletcher  (1790) 2nd time
Joseph Robinson (1790–1794)
John Stewart (1795–1801)
James Curtis (1801–1805)
Robert Hodgson (1806–1812)
Ralph Brecken (1812–1813)
James Curtis (1813–1818) 2nd time
Angus Macaulay (1818–1825)
John Stewart (1825–1831) 2nd time
William McNeill (1831–1835) 
George Dalrymple (1835–1839)
William Cooper (1839–1843)
Joseph Pope (1843–1850)
Alexander Rae (1850–1854)
John Jardine (1854)
Edward Thornton (1854–1859)
Donald Montgomery (1859–1863)
Thomas Heath Haviland (1863–1867)
Joseph Wightman (1867–1870)
John Yeo (1871–1873)

Speakers since Confederation
Stanislaus F. Perry (Poirier) 1873
Cornelius Howatt (1874–1876)
Henry Beer (1877–1878)
John A. MacDonald (1879–1889)
Patrick Blake (1890)
Bernard Donald McLellan (1891–1893)
James Cummiskey (1894–1900)
Samuel E. Reid (1901–1904)
Albert E. Douglas (1905–1908)
Matthew Smith (1909)
John Agnew (1909–1911)
J. Edward Wyatt (1912–1915)
John S. Martin (1916–1917)
Albert P. Prowse (1918–1919)
Gavan Duffy (1920–1923)
Louis Jenkins (1924–1927)
David McDonald (1928–1931)
Walter Fitz-Alan Stewart (1931)
Augustine A. MacDonald (1932–1934)
Heath Strong (1934–1935)
Stephen Hessian (1935–1939)
Walter Fitz-Alan Stewart (1940–1944) 2nd time
Thomas R. Cullen (1944–1947)
Eugene Cullen (1948–1949)
Forrest Phillips (1949–1955)
Augustin Gallant (1956–1959)
Edward Foley (1959)
John R. McLean (1960–1964)
Frank Myers (1965–1966)
Prosper Arsenault (1966–1970)
Cecil A. Miller (1970–1978)
Russell Perry (1978)
Daniel Compton (1979–1983)
Marion Reid (1983–1986)
Edward Clark (1986–1993)
Nancy Guptill (1993–1996)
Wilbur MacDonald (1997–2000)
Mildred A. Dover (2000–2003)
Gregory J. Deighan (2003–2007)
Kathleen M. Casey (2007–2011)
Carolyn Bertram (2011–2015)
Buck Watts (2015–2019)
Colin LaVie (2019–present)

See also
Speaker (politics)
Speaker of the House of Commons of Canada

References
Website of the Speaker

 
Prince Edward Island